Kasper Bleibach (born March 1, 1984) is a Danish sprint canoer who competed in the late 2000s. At the 2008 Summer Olympics in Beijing, he was eliminated in the semifinals of the K-1 500 m event.  In 2008 he also won the K1 500m at Canoe Sprint European Championships.  At the 2012 Summer Olympics, he was eliminated in the semi-finals of the K-1 200 m event, but reached the final of the K-4 1000 m event, finishing in fifth.  That year, he was also part of the winning team the K-4 1000 m at the European Championships.

References

1984 births
Canoeists at the 2008 Summer Olympics
Canoeists at the 2012 Summer Olympics
Danish male canoeists
Living people
Olympic canoeists of Denmark
ICF Canoe Sprint World Championships medalists in kayak